Chasing the Moon is a 2019 American television documentary series by Robert Stone about the race to land a man on the Moon. It includes archive footage not seen previously by the public.

Episodes
Episodes were each about 1 hour 48 minutes in length and covered successive stages in the history of the US space program between 1957 and 1969.

Broadcast
Chasing the Moon was made for PBS and first broadcast on its American Experience program in July 2019 over three successive nights. It was among the documentaries and dramas screened that month to commemorate the 50th anniversary of the Apollo 11 lunar landing.

Reception 
Vern Gay of Newsday wrote, "Stirring history and vitally important."

See also
Apollo 11, a 2019 documentary
 Apollo 11 in popular culture

References

External links

Films about the Apollo program
Documentary films about the space program of the United States
2010s American television miniseries
Cultural depictions of Buzz Aldrin
Cultural depictions of Neil Armstrong
Cultural depictions of Michael Collins (astronaut)
Films set in 1969